Screamplay is a 1985 American horror film directed by Rufus Butler Seder.

Plot
Aspiring screenwriter Edgar Allen (Rufus B. Seder) arrives in Hollywood carrying his most valuable possessions: a battered suitcase and a typewriter. Edgar Allen's best attribute is his wild imagination. He imagines scenes so vividly for the murder mystery he is writing that they seem to come to life...and they do! As mysterious gruesome murders pile up, Edgar Allen must confront aging actresses, rock stars and the police in a bleak setting of broken dreams and hideously broken bodies in Hollywood. As the line between reality and imagination becomes more blurred, Edgar Allen, convinced the only way to be a real writer is to suffer, is driven slowly mad.

Cast
 Rufus Butler Seder as Edgar Allan 
 George Kuchar as Martin
 Katy Bolger as Holly
 Basil J. Bova	as Tony Cassano
 Ed Callahan as Keven Kleindorf
 George Cordeiro as Sgt. Joe Blatz
 M. Lynda Robinson (credited as "Linda Robinson") as Nina Ray
 Eugene Seder as Al Weiner
 Bob White as Lot
 James M. Connor as Nicky Blair

Release
After a theatrical and video release, Troma released the film on DVD in 2005.  This release is currently out of print.

Reception
The film is currently distributed by Troma Entertainment. Many Troma fans cite Screamplay as one of the company's better films in terms of quality: the film is very well received by film fans for its writing and heavy German Expressionism influence, lacking the gratuitous gore, nudity, and/or cheap gags present in most Troma films.

Legacy 
The director of the film, Rufus Butler Seder, would later be most famous for his Scanimation children’s books.

References

External links

1985 films
1985 horror films
American independent films
Troma Entertainment films
1980s English-language films
1980s American films